Görväln House is a manor house at Järfälla Municipality in Stockholm County, Sweden. Görväln House is located at Görväln, a bay of lake Mälaren. The manor  is now owned by Järfälla Municipality and since 2008 has been used as a hotel and restaurant.

History
Görväln House is documented from the 1460s, when it was two farms, owned by the Archdiocese of Uppsala. After the Protestant Reformation in 1520, Görväln became a Crown Property (kronohemman), owned by King John III of Sweden until 1571, when Johan III gave it  to the Italian nobleman Antonius de Palma and his family. From 1605–61 Görvälns was owned by the Swedish noble family Bjelke. During the Bjelke era the main building was lower on the connector than presently. During Count Adolph John I's years as owner, a new main building was built. Görväln House was the location for the 2011 season of the SVT show Stjärnorna på slottet.

References

External links
Görvälns Slott website

Buildings and structures in Stockholm County
Manor houses in Sweden